Franz Barwig (19 April 1868 – 15 May 1931) was an Austrian sculptor. His work was part of the sculpture event in the art competition at the 1928 Summer Olympics. He committed suicide by shooting himself in 1931.

References

Further reading
Gerbert Frodl: Franz Barwig 1868–1931. Exhibition catalogue, Österreichische Galerie, Wien 1969
Gabriele Kala: Die Tierplastiken Franz Barwigs des Älteren 1868–1931. Dissertation, Vienna 1978
"Barwig Franz". In: Österreichisches Biographisches Lexikon 1815–1950 (ÖBL). Band 1, Verlag der Österreichischen Akademie der Wissenschaften, Wien 1957, p. 52
Felix Czeike (ed.): "Barwig Franz d. Ä.". In: Historisches Lexikon Wien. Band 1, Kremayr & Scheriau, Wien 1992, p. 265 (online version)

1868 births
1931 suicides
20th-century Austrian sculptors
Austrian male sculptors
Olympic competitors in art competitions
People from Nový Jičín District
Suicides by firearm in Austria
Moravian-German people
Austrian people of Moravian-German descent
20th-century Austrian male artists